Susan is a feature film produced and directed by Mahmoud Shoolizadeh, that has participated in several international film festivals in 2018 and 2019, and has received several awards and nominations. The movie was filmed in London.

Plot
"SUSAN is a story of Love and War. A feature social drama film about Susan who lives in London, England with her loving family. She loses her husband in the Afghanistan war; she suffers but keeps her Love and hope alive. In this film Susan represents a symbol of love and kindness. She faces many challenges in her life, though she tries hard to keep the kindness and love, even in the very difficult circumstances she is facing. While she is alone, full of pain and misery, one unexpected moment happens and this is just the beginning!"

Reception
Several reviews of the film have been published in media by elite film critiques, including a positive review on Florida's influx magazine explaining how the movie brings the audience out of their comfort zones and into a difficult to watch reality. An interview with the film director published on The Florida Times Union depicting the director's review and purpose for this genre.

Awards and Nominees
Award Winner of the Best Feature Film (Mahmoud Shoolizadeh) at the "Mediterranean Film Festival Cannes", Cannes, France, November 2019.
Award Winner of the Best Lead Actress (Jennifer Preston) at the "Mediterranean Film Festival Cannes", Cannes, France, November 2019
Award Winner of the Best Lead Actress (Jennifer Preston) at the "Great Lakes State International Film Festival", Bay City, Michigan, USA, August 2019
Nominee for the Best Drama Feature Award (Mahmoud Shoolizadeh) at the "Genre Celebretion International Film Festival", Tokyo, Japan, June 2019 
Nominee for the Best Actress Award (Jennifer Preston) at the "Genre Celebration International Film Festival", Tokyo, Japan, June 2019
Nominee for the Best Feature Film Award  (Mahmoud Shoolizadeh) at the "Hong Kong Art Film International Film Festival", Hong Kong, June 2019
Nominee for the Best Lead Actress Award (Jennifer Preston) at the "Hong Kong Art Film International Film Festival", Hong Kong, June 2019
Award Winner of the Best Director (Mahmoud Shoolizadeh) at the "Eurasian Creative Guild Film Festival", London, United Kingdom, June 2019
Award Winner of the Best Feature Film (Mahmoud Shoolizadeh) at the "Under The Stars International Film Festival", Fellini Edition, Beri, Italy, 2019 
Award Winner of the Best UK Narrative-Feature film (Mahmoud Shoolizadeh) at the "London International Motion Picture Awards", London, United Kingdom, May 2019
Nominee for the Best Drama Feature Film Award (Mahmoud Shoolizadeh) at the "Independent Film Awards-London", London, United Kingdom, April 2019.
Award for the Best International Feature Film (Mahmoud Shoolizadeh) at the "Olympus International Film Festival - Los Angeles", California, USA, July 2019
Award for the Best Feature Fiction Film (Mahmoud Shoolizadeh) at the Branson International Film Festival, Branson, Missourie, USA, April 2019
Nominee for the Best Lead Actress (Jennifer Preston) at the Branson International Film Festival, Branson, Missourie, USA, April 2019
Nominee for the Best Lead Actor (Mitchell Thornton) at the Branson International Film Festival, Branson, Missourie, USA, April 2019
Nominee for the Best Cinematographer (Jesse Mickel) at the Branson International Film Festival, Branson, Missourie, USA, April 2019
Nominee for the Best Young Actress (Holly Lawton) at the Branson International Film Festival, Branson, Missourie, USA, April 2019
Nominee for the Best Supporting actor (Christopher Mulvin) at the Branson International Film Festival, Branson, Missourie, USA, April 2019
Nominee for the Best Narrative Full Length Film Award (Mahmoud Shoolizadeh) at the "Independent Talents International Film Festival", Blooming, Indiana, USA, February 2019 
Nominee for the Best Feature Film at the 5th Erie International Film Festival, Erie, Pennsylvania, USA, December 2018
Award for the Best Editing Feature Film at the Five Continents International Film Festival, Puerto La Cruz, Venezuela, November 2018
Award for Special Mention Director Mahmoud Shoolizadeh at the Five Continents International Film Festival, Puerto La Cruz, Venezuela, November 2018
Award for the Best Drama Feature Film Mahmoud Shoolizadeh at the Five Continents International Film Festival, Puerto La Cruz, Venezuela, November 2018
Award for the Best Actress (Jennifer Preston) at the Top Indie Film Awards, Los Angeles, California, USA, October 2018
Nominee for the Best Cinematographer (Jesse Mickle) at the Top Indie Film Awards, Los Angeles, California, USA, October 2018
Nominee for the Best Music Composer (George Palousis) at the Top Indie Film Awards, Los Angeles, California, USA, October 2018
Nominee for the Best Feature Film at the Top Indie Film Awards, Los Angeles, California, USA, October 2018

International Film Festival Participations
Waco Family & Faith International Film Festival, Waco, Texas, USA, February 2020
Mediterranean Film Festival Cannes, Cannes, France, November 2019
Lifft India Filmotsav World Cinefest, Malavli Pune, India, December 2019
New York City International Films Infest Festival (US) (NYCIFIF), New York, USA, October 2019
Overcome International Film Festival, Anaheim, California, USA, October 2019
Rieti & Sabina Film Festival, Rieti, Italy, November 2019
New Harvest Film Festival, Moscow, Rassia, August 2019
Motion Picture International Film Festival, Salt Lake City, Utah, USA, August 2019
Great Lakes State Film Festival, Bay City, Michigan, USA, August 2019
Film Festival Angaelica, Los Angeles, California, USA, July 2019
Borodino Film Festival, New York, USA, August 2019
Social World International Film Festival, Napoli, Italy, July–August 2019
Genre Celebration International Film Festival, Tokyo, Japan, June 2019
Hong Kong Film Art International Film Festival, Hong Kong, July 2019
Golden Hollywood International Film Festival, Los Angeles, California, USA, June 2019
Tarpon Art International Film Festival, Tarpon, Florida, USA, June 2019
Under The Stars International Film Festival, Bari, Italy, 2019
Eurasian Creative Guild Film Festival, Romford, London, United Kingdom, June 2019
London International Motion Picture Awards, London, United Kingdom, May 2019
Festpro International Film Festival, Moscow, Russia, May 2019 
14th Hoboken International Film Festival, Greenwood Lake, New York, USA, May 2019  
Independent Film Awards- London, London, United Kingdom, April 2019
Olympus International Film Festival - Los Angeles, California, USA, July 2019
Sands International Film Festival, Jacksonville, Florida, USA, April 2019
Utah International Film Festival, Vineyard, Utah, USA, April 2019
One Race Human Race Film Festival, Indiana, Indianapolis, USA, March 2019
SENSUS International Film Festival, St. Petersburg, Russa, March 2019
Independent Talents International Film Festival, Bloomington, Indiana, USA, February 2019
Branson International Film Festival, Branson, Missouri, USA, April 2019
Beirut International Women Film Festival, Beirut, Lebanon, March 2019
International Innovation Film Festival, Bern, Switzerland, February 2019
iVision International Film Series, Tampa, Florida, USA, February 2019
Caribbean Sea International Film Festival, Margarita, Venezuela, January 2019
Los Angeles CineFest International Film Festival, Santa Monica, California, USA, December 2018
International Film Festival Catharsis, Moscow, Rassian, December 2018
5th Erie International Film Festival, Erie, Pennsylvania, USA, December 2018
Five Continents International Film Festival, Puerto La Cruz, Venezuela, November 2018
Top Indie Film Awards, Los Angeles, California, USA, October 2018
Rome independent Prisma Awards, Rome, Italy, October 2018
Cardiff  International Film Festival, Cardiff, England, UK, October 2018

References

External links 
 
 Official Movie Trailer: Love story of "SUSAN" Official Trailer, 2018
 Second official Movie Trailer: Love story of "SUSAN" Official Trailer (second version), 2018
 Official Film website: Susan (film)
 Florida Times Union article: 'Send my message to all the people'
 Influx magazine USA review of the film: 'Susan' (2018) Review: A Realistic Depiction Of Misery

2018 films
2010s English-language films